CYM or Cym may refer to:

Organisations
 Choctaw Youth Movement, a Choctaw nationalist party and grassroots movement in Oklahoma
 Connolly Youth Movement, an Irish Marxist–Leninist  youth group
 Centre for Young Musicians, London
 Spilka Ukraïns'koï Molodi (Спілка української молоді), the Ukrainian Youth Association
 CYM RFC, a Rugby Club in Dublin, Ireland

Standardised codes
 Cayman Islands, by ISO 3166-1 country code
 Welsh language or Cymraeg, by ISO 639 language code 
 .cym, an unused top-level Internet domain
 Chatham Seaplane Base, United States, by IATA airport code

Other uses
 Cym, the Cymbidium orchid genus
 CYM, the CMYK color model, in printing